Rakin Misbah Adetola Fetuga (born 21 January 1971) is an English rapper and music producer of Nigerian descent.

Early life
Fetuga was born in Ladbroke Grove, London, England. His parents, both Nigerian, came to the United Kingdom in the 1960s to further their education. His Muslim father was an accountant, whilst his mother was a Christian working for the London Transport. When Fetuga was a teenager his parents separated, and in his mother's care he was brought up as a Christian. Through his early life, he has been Catholic, Jehovah's Witness and Methodist.

Career
In 1985, Fetuga and his childhood friends formed Cash Crew, he left Holland Park School before his A-levels when they were signed to Virgin Records and BMG France. He was a DJ, producer, breakdancer and graffiti artist as well as a rapper, known at the time as Rakin da Authordox aka Trim. Fetuga converted to Islam along with the others members. and in 1992, the group recorded the first ever Islamic rap song "The Provider". In 1995, Fetuga left the group.

Fetuga then studied Islam under the guidance of Shaykh Ahmed Ba'biker Abu Bakr As-Sudani who encouraged him to use rap for da'wah (inviting others to Islam)  and to continue using his musical talents to make Islamic music. In 1996, he formed the group Mecca2Medina. In 1999, he graduated with a BSc in Sociology from the University of Roehampton  and then started voluntary work before being recruited to train as a mentor.

As well as recording and performing, Fetuga has also presented programmes such as the Global Peace and Unity Event Nasheed Contest for Islam Channel in 2008. He has co-hosted and managed the urban stages at the Islam Expo in Olympia and the Global Peace and Unity Event in ExCeL Exhibition Centre.

In September 2010, Fetuga released a solo album The Road Less Travelled credited to the stage name "Rakin Niass", featuring other hip hop artists, including Poetic Pilgrimage.

Fetuga is the CEO of Crescent Moon Media record label. He runs workshops to support youth, teaches Religious studies at Oasis Academy Hadley. He also teaches Islamic studies at the weekends, and is also life coach. Fetuga's latest initiative is to bring awareness to the epidemic of youth violence in the inner cities.  He formed an organisation called 'Save Our Boys' which holds events in the community and in schools.  He is also part of the Rumi's Cave team working as a teacher, events host, speaker and Imam for Friday congregational prayers and Ramadan taraweer prayers.

Personal life
Fetuga is a muqaddam (student) of the Tijaniyyah Sufi order. He now lives in Kilburn, London with his wife, Adwoa-Amina Elsie Ofori, and four children.

Discography

The Road Less Travelled (2011)

Track listing

Clarity (2011)

Track listing

See also

Black British
British Nigerian
British hip hop
List of converts to Islam
Islamic music
Nasheed

References

External links

Rakin Fetuga on ReverbNation
Mecca2Medina website 

Coughlan, Sean How mentors make a difference. BBC News. 24 January 2001
Muslims in the House. emel. Issue 8, November/December 2004
Fetuga, Rakin. Rooted in Our Lives. Arts and Islam Hip Hop Debate. 14 June 2008

1971 births
Living people
English Muslims
Sunni Sufis
English people of Nigerian descent
English former Christians
Converts to Islam from Christianity
British hip hop singers
English male rappers
Black British male rappers
Hip hop record producers
Performers of Islamic music
Life coaches
Rappers from London
People from the Royal Borough of Kensington and Chelsea
Alumni of the University of Roehampton
Former Roman Catholics
Former Jehovah's Witnesses
Former Methodists